The Austrian Sailing Federation is the national governing body for the sport of sailing in Austria, recognised by World Sailing.

Notable sailors
See :Category:Austrian sailors

Olympic sailing
See :Category:Olympic sailors of Austria

Offshore sailing
See :Category:Austrian sailors (sport)

References

External links
 Official website

Austria
Sailing
Sailing
1946 establishments in Austria